The twelfth series of the British science fiction television programme Doctor Who premiered on 1 January 2020 and aired until 1 March 2020. It is the second series to be led by Chris Chibnall as head writer and executive producer, alongside executive producer Matt Strevens, the twelfth to air after the programme's revival in 2005, and the thirty-eighth season overall. The twelfth series was broadcast on Sundays, except for the premiere episode, continuing the trend from the eleventh series. Prior to the eleventh series, regular episodes of the revived era were commonly broadcast on Saturdays. The series was followed by the 2021 New Year's Day special, "Revolution of the Daleks".

Jodie Whittaker returns for her second series as the Thirteenth Doctor, an incarnation of the Doctor, an alien Time Lord who travels through time and space in her TARDIS, which appears from the outside to be an old fashioned British police box. It also stars Bradley Walsh, Tosin Cole and Mandip Gill as the Doctor's travelling companions, playing Graham O'Brien, Ryan Sinclair and Yasmin Khan, respectively. The series follows the Thirteenth Doctor and her companions as they meet a new incarnation of the Master, and his destruction of Gallifrey, the return of Jack Harkness, the appearance of an unknown incarnation of the Doctor, the Cybermen, and the secret of the "Timeless Child".

The ten episodes were directed by Jamie Magnus Stone, Lee Haven Jones, Nida Manzoor and Emma Sullivan. Alongside Chibnall, who wrote four of the scripts and co-wrote a further three, the writers include Ed Hime, Pete McTighe and Vinay Patel, who return from writing the previous series, as well as new contributors Nina Metivier, Maxine Alderton and Charlene James. Filming commenced in January 2019 and had concluded by November 2019.

Episodes

The twelfth series included two-part stories for the first time since the tenth series, and more than one two-part story for the first time since the ninth series. "Spyfall" is the first two-part story not to use separate titles for its episodes since "The End of Time" (2009–10).

Casting

The series is the second to feature Jodie Whittaker as the Thirteenth Doctor. Bradley Walsh, Tosin Cole and Mandip Gill also reprise their roles as Graham O'Brien, Ryan Sinclair and Yasmin Khan, respectively.

Stephen Fry and Lenny Henry appeared in the two-part premiere episode "Spyfall". Dominique Maher and Darron Meyer portrayed Agent Browning and Seesay respectively in "Spyfall". Sacha Dhawan appeared unannounced in "Spyfall, Part 1", and was revealed at the end of the episode to be the Master. Aurora Marion portrayed Noor Inayat Khan in "Spyfall, Part 2". James Buckley appeared in "Orphan 55" as Nevi. Laura Fraser also appeared in "Orphan 55" as Kane, as did Julia Foster as Vilma. Goran Višnjić and Robert Glenister were also cast as Nikola Tesla and Thomas Edison respectively. They appeared in "Nikola Tesla's Night of Terror", as well. Anjli Mohindra, who had previously portrayed Rani Chandra in the Doctor Who spin-off The Sarah Jane Adventures, played Queen Skithra in "Nikola Tesla's Night of Terror".

John Barrowman returned to his role as Jack Harkness in "Fugitive of the Judoon" and also for "Revolution of the Daleks". This is his first appearance on the show since "The End of Time - Part Two" in 2010. Jo Martin appeared as a previously unknown incarnation of the Doctor using the alias 'Ruth Clayton' in "Fugitive of the Judoon". Neil Stuke appeared in "Fugitive of the Judoon", and Nicholas Briggs provided the voice of the Judoon. Molly Harris appeared as Suki Cheng in "Praxeus". Warren Brown was also cast in that episode.

Sharon D. Clarke reprises her role as Graham's late wife, Grace, in "Can You Hear Me?". Maxim Baldry appeared as Dr John Polidori in "The Haunting of Villa Diodati". Jacob Collins-Levy also appeared as Lord Byron in the same episode. Julie Graham, Ian McElhinney and Steve Toussaint guest star in the two-part finale, "Ascension of the Cybermen" / "The Timeless Children".

In SFX #355, it was confirmed that "Revolution of the Daleks" would be the final appearances by Walsh and Cole, Chris Noth would return as Jack Robertson from "Arachnids in the UK" (2018), and that Harriet Walter had been cast.

Production

Development
In April 2015, Steven Moffat confirmed that Doctor Who would run for at least another five years, extending the show until 2020. In May 2017, it was announced that due to the terms of a deal between BBC Worldwide and SMG Pictures in China, SMG has first right of refusal on the purchase for the Chinese market of future series of the programme until and including Series 15.

Chris Chibnall returned as the series's showrunner, the role he took on following Steven Moffat's departure after the tenth series. Matt Strevens also returned to serve as executive producer alongside Chibnall.

Writing
Ed Hime (who wrote the penultimate episode of the previous series) wrote "Orphan 55". Nina Metivier, who served as script editor on the previous series, also wrote "Nikola Tesla's Night of Terror". In November 2019, Doctor Who Magazine revealed the writers for the twelfth series, including Vinay Patel, Pete McTighe, Maxine Alderton and Charlene James, as well as Hime, Métivier and Chibnall. Chibnall wrote four episodes and co-wrote a further three. In a Radio Times article, Chibnall confirmed that Series 12 would feature the return of two-part stories.

Design changes
The twelfth series introduced changes to the design of the TARDIS, with the differences including a modified column above the time rotor, an updated pathway from the TARDIS's doors, the inclusion of stairs, and modifications to the central console. These changes were introduced by production designer Dafydd Shurmer. Some episodes feature cold openings, which had been consistently used in the revived era but were entirely absent in the eleventh series.

Filming
Costume designer Ray Holman listed the twelfth series as being in pre-production in November 2018. By 17 November, BBC confirmed that Series 12 had begun production. Jamie Magnus Stone, who previously directed the fiftieth-anniversary mini-episode "The Last Day", directed the first block, which comprised the first and sixth episodes of the series. Lee Haven Jones directed the second and third episodes in the second block. Nida Manzoor directed the third block of the fourth and fifth episodes. Emma Sullivan directed the fourth block of the seventh and eighth episodes. Stone directed the fifth block of the ninth and tenth episodes.

Filming commenced on 23 January 2019 in South Africa, and concluded on 7 February, taking place at Western Cape, Hopefield, Lion's Head, and Taal Monument. Filming took place in Cardiff and Wales between February and October 2019. Filming also took place in Tenerife, Gloucester, and Merthyr Mawr. Filming concluded by 19 November 2019.

The 2021 New Year's Day special, "Revolution of the Daleks", was filmed by Lee Haven Jones. In April 2020, Chibnall confirmed that post-production was continuing on "Revolution of the Daleks" remotely throughout the COVID-19 pandemic. 

Production blocks were arranged as follows:

Music
Segun Akinola returned to compose for the twelfth series.

Release

Promotion
A poster for the twelfth series was released on 21 November 2019. The first trailer for the series was released on 23 November 2019, coinciding with the programme's fifty-sixth anniversary. Another trailer was released on 2 December 2019 alongside news of the series's premiere date. Forbidden Planet released shirts weekly with themes that corresponded to each week's broadcast episode of Series 12. Two new trailers were released mid-series on 20 January and 7 February 2020.

Broadcast
The BBC confirmed after the eleventh series's finale that the twelfth series would premiere in "very early" 2020. BBC confirmed on 2 December 2019 that the series was set to premiere on 1 January 2020, and would air through 1 March 2020. The twelfth series was broadcast on Sundays, bar the premiere episode which aired on a Wednesday, continuing on from the format of the eleventh series, after regular episodes of the revived era had previously been broadcast on Saturdays.

The "Spyfall" two-part episode was released in cinemas in the United States on 5 January 2020. The series was followed by a special episode, "Revolution of the Daleks", on New Year's Day in 2021.

Home media

The twelfth series was released on 4 May 2020 in Region 2, and included the 2019 special "Resolution" in the boxset.

Reception

Ratings
The series gained the lowest ratings since the revival of the show in 2005, containing six of the show's ten least-watched episodes. The average viewing figure for this series was 5.40 million UK viewers. The series finale was the least-watched episode of the show since 2005, at 4.69 million viewers. Nielsen ratings of the show on BBC America for the key demographic, people aged 18 to 34, dropped by 52.5% compared to the previous series, down to 0.13.

Critical reception

Doctor Whos twelfth series received positive reviews from critics. Series 12 holds a 78% approval rating on online review aggregation site Rotten Tomatoes with an average score of 6.55/10, based on 179 critic reviews. The site's consensus reads "Doctor Whos twelfth outing adds welcome nuances to Jodie Whittaker's Doctor and some scary new layers of horror to some of the series' most terrifying villains." Metacritic calculated a weighted average score of 80 out of 100 from 4 reviews of the series premiere, indicating "generally favorable reviews".

Awards and nominations

Soundtrack
48 selected pieces of score from this series as composed by Segun Akinola were released in a 2-CD set on 3 April 2020 by Silva Screen Records. Twelve selected pieces of score from "Revolution of the Daleks" as composed by Segun Akinola were released on digital music platforms on 2 January 2021 by Silva Screen Records, which were also released on CD 11 November 2022 as a bonus disc to the Series 13 – Flux soundtrack release.

Notes

References

External links

 

2020 British television seasons
Series 12
Series 12